J.T. is a studio album by American rock band Steve Earle & The Dukes. The album is a tribute to Earle's oldest son, Justin Townes Earle, who died of an accidental drug overdose on August 20, 2020. It was released by New West Records on January 4, 2021 on what would have been Justin's 39th birthday.  Recording sessions took place at Electric Lady Studios in New York City with Ray Kennedy as audio engineer. Production was handled by Steve Earle himself.  At Metacritic, which assigns a normalized rating out of 100 to reviews from mainstream publications, the album received an average score of 82 based on eleven reviews.

The album's genesis 
Justin Townes Earle released eight albums and an EP over a span of 13 years. Like his father, he struggled with addiction, beginning with heroin use before turning 13.<ref name=NewYorkTimes While problems with substance abuse strained their relationship, the father and son appeared to have reconciled more recently, and they spoke on the phone the night Justin died in his Nashville apartment. The cause of death was ruled an accidental overdose of cocaine and the opium derivative fentanyl.

Shortly after Justin's death, Steve Earle began working on an album in his memory. With the help of his 33-year-old son Ian, Earle selected 10 songs from six of Justin's albums. He then booked a week at Jimi Hendrix's Electric Lady Studios in New York City, where he recorded 2020's Ghosts of West Virginia.

Regarding his motivation for recording J.T., Earle wrote in the liner notes, "For better or worse, right or wrong, I loved Justin Townes Earle more than anything else on this earth. That being said, I made this record, like every other record I’ve ever made...for me. It was the only way I knew to say goodbye."

The songs 
All of the songs on J.T., except one, were either written or co-written by Justin Townes Earle. Together, they provide an overview of the songwriter's career, featuring both fan favorites and deep cuts.

The opening track, "I Don't Care", is a rocking bluegrass tune that appeared on Justin's EP Yuma in 2007. Four of the songs are taken from his first album, 2008's The Good Life: "Ain't Glad I'm Leaving", "Far Away in Another Town", "Turn Out My Lights", and "Lone Pine Hill". Interspersed between these songs are selections from five subsequent albums: "They Killed John Henry", Midnight at the Movies, 2009; "Harlem River Blues", the title track of his second album, 2010; "Maria", Nothing's Gonna Change the Way You Feel About Me Now, 2012; "Champagne Corolla", Kids in the Street, 2017; and "The Saint of Lost Causes", the title track of his final release, 2019.

"Last Words," the closing track, is the album's only original. Composed by Steve Earle in the weeks following Justin's death, it recounts the last conversation between the two, in the phone call the night he died. The song also reflects on their rocky relationship during times spent together and apart. It closes with their final words to each other: "I love you" and "I love you, too".

Track listing

Personnel

Steve Earle & The Dukes 
 Steve Earle – guitar, mandolin, octave mandolin, harmonica, vocals, producer
 Chris Masterson – guitar, mandolin, one finger piano, vocals
 Eleanor Whitmore – fiddle, mandolin, organ, vocals
 Ricky Ray Jackson – pedal steel guitar, dobro, vocals
 Jeff Hill – acoustic and electric bass, cello, vocals
 Brad Pemberton – drums, percussion, vocals
Source:

Additional personnel 
 Ian Dublin Earle - associate producer
 Ray Kennedy – recording, mixing, mastering
 John Rooney – assistant recording
 Laurence Kern – guitar tech
 Tom Bejgrowicz – package design & layout
 Tony Fitzpatrick – cover art
 Danny Clinch – photography
 Shervin Lainez - photography
 Sara Sharpe – photography
Source:

Charts

References

External links

2021 albums
Tribute albums
Steve Earle albums
New West Records albums
Albums produced by Steve Earle
Albums recorded at Electric Lady Studios